Count Your Change is a 1919 American short comedy film featuring Harold Lloyd.

Plot
The Boy has just been violently evicted from his boardinghouse for being five weeks behind in his rent.  Hungry and penniless, he pilfers a sausage from a hot dog stand—only to have the sausage taken from his hand by a stray dog.  The Boy angrily pursues the dog in an elaborate chase until the dog menacingly shows its teeth.  Then the chase is reversed and the dog pursues The Boy.  The dog eventually chases The Boy into a nearby hotel where he gets into a scuffle with Billy Bullion, a drunken reveler.  Shortly thereafter, The Boy prevents a girl, Miss Flighty, from being robbed at gunpoint in her room.  The film ends with Miss Flighty and The Boy befriending the dog.

Cast
 Harold Lloyd as the boy
 Snub Pollard as Billy Bullion (as Harry Pollard)
 Bebe Daniels as Miss Flighty
 Sammy Brooks
 Lige Conley (as Lige Cromley)
 Wallace Howe
 Bud Jamison
 Dee Lampton
 Marie Mosquini
 Fred C. Newmeyer (as Fred Newmeyer)
 James Parrott

See also
 List of American films of 1919
 Harold Lloyd filmography

External links

1919 films
Silent American comedy films
American silent short films
American black-and-white films
Films directed by Alfred J. Goulding
1919 comedy films
1919 short films
Films with screenplays by H. M. Walker
American comedy short films
1910s American films
1910s English-language films